Max Andersson (born 26 October 1973) is a Swedish politician. He was a Member of the Swedish Parliament, representing the Green Party, between 2006 and 2010, and a Member of the European Parliament (MEP) from 2014 until 2019.

In 2019, Andersson left the Green party to join the newly formed political party Vändpunkt.

Parliamentary service
Member, Committee on Legal Affairs
Member, Delegation for relations with the People's Republic of China

References

1973 births
Living people
Politicians from Stockholm
Green Party (Sweden) MEPs
MEPs for Sweden 2014–2019